The Opéra du Quai au Foin was the first public theatre in Brussels. Opened on 24 January 1682, it was abandoned in 1697 and turned into a warehouse.

History
Under the aegis of the governor of the Habsburg Netherlands Alexandre Farnese, Gio-Battista Petrucci, royal historian, and Pierre Fariseau, a notable figure in Brussels society, hired a building on the prairies of the Grand Béguinage, on the banks of the quai au Foin, to a squire. In a few months the building was transformed into a theatre and the decor and props from the palace plays were brought to it. It was opened in 1682 and its opening-night shows lasted throughout the carnival period. Petrucci had over 140 people at his command — actors, musicians and set-operators. The first play put on was  Egeo in Atene, an opera by Angelo Vitali, followed by several works by Lully.

Abandoned in 1689, it reopened at the end of 1694 under the joint leadership of Gio Paolo Bombarda and Pietro Antonio Fiocco. It closed for good at the end of 1697 to make room, three years later, for the new "Théâtre sur la Monnoye".

References 
 Henri Liebrecht: L’Opéra du Quai au Foin (1681-1698) in Histoire Du Theatre Francais p. 91.

Theatres in Brussels
1682 establishments in the Holy Roman Empire
1697 disestablishments
City of Brussels